Vivas is a surname. Notable people with the surname include:

Achito Vivas (born 1934), Colombian footballer
Anaís Vivas (born 1989), Venezuelan singer
Ángel Vivas (born 1956), Venezuelan general
Borja Vivas (born 1984), Spanish shot putter
César Pérez Vivas (born 1957), Venezuelan lawyer and politician
Darío Vivas (1950–2020), Venezuelan politician
Félix Saurí Vivas, Puerto Rican businessman
José Vivas (born 1928), Venezuelan architect
Kathy Vivas (born 1972), Venezuelan astrophysicist
Lindy Vivas, American volleyball player and coach
Nelson Vivas (born 1969), Argentine footballer